Rhagades predotae is a moth of the family Zygaenidae. It is known from central, southern and eastern Spain.

The length of the forewings is 9–10 mm for both males and females. Adults are on wing during the day.

The larvae feed on Prunus spinosa and Pyrus bourgaeana.

References

C. M. Naumann, W. G. Tremewan: The Western Palaearctic Zygaenidae. Apollo Books, Stenstrup 1999, 

Procridinae
Moths described in 1931